Military pay or military compensation is the pay system by which members of the military are compensated for their participation in the military.

As parts of government pay systems, military pay typically does not compete with private military compensation.

Because military service requires fit soldiers and commitments that might reach well beyond civilian employment, governments typically provided additional health care, military housing and retirement or veteran's benefits.

International pay differences 
Basic annual pay to rank in US dollars for the minimum per rank excluding all additional allowances, bonuses and benefits:

 Australia
Canada
 United Kingdom
 United States
 France
 Germany
 Japan
 Russia
 Italy

Exchange rates used were accurate as of 02/04/2018.
Pay ranking does not include additional benefits such as medical, pension, living expenses and bonuses (for example, hazard pay, hardship allowance, field allowance, etc.)

Overall, Australia’s military personnel are paid the highest salaries, based on the fact that their Private and Corporal pay scale goes up to 10 Pay incentives. A Private in the Australian military will make $88,748 AUD (as of Nov 14 2019) without any bonuses after 10 years. When comparing the top countries, Canada came in second place.

By country

Australia 
For Australian Figures (AUD>USD) used Exchange rates for 18 May, 7:36 pm UTC                                                                                                                                                                                                                                                                                                                Australian figures exclude a approximate $13,000 AUD service & uniform allowance, ADF Superannuation, rent assist (approximate $26,000 p.a AUD for Junior officers and Other ranks:depends on posting area) and other allowances such as Maritime allowance

United Kingdom

United States

References 

Military pay and benefits